Cotton Candy is an album by Al Hirt that was released in 1964 by RCA Victor. The album features the Anita Kerr Singers.

The title track hit No. 3 on the Easy Listening chart and No. 15 on the Billboard Hot 100. "Walkin'" was released as the B-Side to "Cotton Candy" and reached No. 103 on the Billboard 100. The album landed on the Billboard 200 chart in 1964, reaching #6.

Track listing 
 "Cotton Candy" (Russ Damon)
 "Hello, Dolly!" (Jerry Herman)
 "Django's Castle" (Django Reinhardt)
 "Moo Moo" (Allen Toussaint)
 "Last Date" (Floyd Cramer)
 "Big Man" (Beasley Smith)
 "Walkin'" (Jerry Reed)
 "Too Late (Trop Tard)" (Charles Aznavour)
 "Rumpus" (Shurelon J. Jones)
 "Melissa" (Tupper Saussy)
 "Walkin' with Mr. Lee" (Lee Allen)
 "12th Street Rag" (Euday L. Bowman)

Personnel
Al Hirt - trumpet
Al Hirt and His Orchestra - orchestra
Al Hirt and His Chorus - chorus
Bob Moore, Boots Randolph, Buddy Harman, Dutch McMillin, Floyd Cramer, Grady Martin, Ray Edenton, The Anita Kerr Singers - musicians
Technical
Chuck Seitz - recording engineer

Chart positions

Singles

References

1964 albums
Al Hirt albums
Albums produced by Chet Atkins
RCA Records albums